The Chaude River flows successively in the municipalities of Mont-Carmel, Saint-Gabriel-Lalemant and Saint-Onésime-d'Ixworth, in the MRC of Kamouraska Regional County Municipality, in the administrative region of Bas-Saint-Laurent, in the province of Quebec, in Canada .

The Chaude river is a tributary of the east bank of the Grande Rivière (Ouelle river), which flows on the east bank of the Ouelle River which in turn flows on the south bank of  St. Lawrence River.

Geography 

The Chaude River rises at Lac Chaudière which is located in the municipality of Mont-Carmel in the heart of Notre Dame Mountains.

  south in Mont-Carmel, until the confluence of a stream (coming from the south) which drains the place called "La Plaine Molle";
  towards the north-west, until the confluence of the watercourse designated "Tête de la Rivière Chaude" which rises at "Lac des Cinq Milles" and flows ;
  north-east, to the Canadian National railway;
  westwards, to the limit between Saint-Gabriel-Lalemant;
  west in Saint-Gabriel-Lalemant, to the limit of Saint-Onésime-d'Ixworth;
  westwards, to its confluence.

The confluence of the river is located in the municipality of Saint-Onésime-d'Ixworth.

Toponymy 
The toponym Chaude River was formalized on December 2, 1975, by the Commission de toponymie du Québec.

See also 

 St. Lawrence River
 Ouelle River, a stream
 Grande Rivière (Ouelle River), a stream
 Mont-Carmel, a municipality
 Saint-Gabriel-Lalemant, a municipality
 Saint-Onésime-d'Ixworth, a municipality
 Kamouraska Regional County Municipality

References

External links 

Rivers of Bas-Saint-Laurent